The Church of San Juan Bautista (Spanish: Iglesia de San Juan Bautista) is a church located in Arganda del Rey, Spain. It was declared Bien de Interés Cultural in 1999.

The church has a Latin cross plan with three naves. It has a lantern topped with a very harmonious and high-rise spire. The 60-meter-high bell tower erected between 1709 and 1714 is located on the west facade of the building. The tower is topped by a typically Madrid-style slate spire, with a ball, weathercock and cross, built in 1781. The Baroque altarpiece from the first third of the 17th century is remarkable.

References 

Churches in the Community of Madrid
Bien de Interés Cultural landmarks in the Community of Madrid
Arganda del Rey